IAMWARM (Irrigated Agriculture Modernisation and Water-bodies Restoration and Management) is a 6-year water management project in the arid Indian state of Tamil Nadu that aims to facilitate efficient irrigation practices by local farmers.

In Tamil Nadu, this IAMWARM project successfully implemented as TN-IAMWARM

External links 
 Official site
 TN-IAMWARM - IAMWARM Project in Tamil Nadu

Agriculture in Tamil Nadu
Water supply
Irrigation in India